Bring the Monkey : A Light Novel (1933) is a crime/mystery novel by Australian writer Miles Franklin.

Story outline

This is a mystery novel involving a murder and the theft of jewels from an English country mansion, Tattingwood Hall.

Critical reception

In The West Australian a reviewer noted: "It is something more than a mystery story, however, and might be as aptly described as a highly amusing and clever satire on certain aspects of modern English and American social life, in which a wealthy film artist with an avid love of publicity and an amateur aviator's craze of flying stunts are satirised with rare subtlety. The part which a monkey plays in the story gives it a bizarre flavour and heightens the entertainment of the author's spicy narrative."

While acknowledging the standard setup of the mystery in the novel a reviewer in The News (Adelaide) found that " in her handling of her story, Miss Franklin strikes a note which should arrest the interest of even the most knowledgeable of mystery and story tastes. There is a sophistication and sprightly satirical humor in her style which is as diverting as it is novel in a book of this type."

See also

 1933 in Australian literature

References

Novels by Miles Franklin
Australian crime novels
1933 Australian novels
Novels set in England
Satirical novels
Monkeys in popular culture